Nicole and Her Virtue (French: Nicole et sa vertu) is a 1932 French drama film directed by René Hervil and starring Alice Cocéa, André Roanne and Paulette Duvernet.

Cast
 Alice Cocéa as Nicole Versin  
 André Roanne as Lucien Versin  
 Paulette Duvernet as Mado Vinci  
 Andrée Méry as Mme. Buzet  
 Claude Barghon as Le petit François  
 Robert Goupil as Lafillette 
 Enrique Rivero as Luisito

References

Bibliography 
 Crisp, Colin. Genre, Myth and Convention in the French Cinema, 1929-1939. Indiana University Press, 2002.

External links 
 

1932 films
1932 drama films
French drama films
1930s French-language films
Films directed by René Hervil
American black-and-white films
1930s French films